The Football  is a prominent bare rock scar of football shape on the north side of Football Mountain in Antarctica, on the ridge separating Edisto Inlet and Tucker Glacier. The scar is surrounded by an unbroken snow slope and is said to be always visible, though occasionally lightly covered by snow for short periods, and is consequently a landmark for pilots and men at Hallett Station. It was given this descriptive name by the New Zealand Geological Survey Antarctic Expedition, 1957–58.

The Football lends its name to both Football Mountain and Football Saddle.

References 

Rock formations of Victoria Land
Borchgrevink Coast